The Prins Bernhardhoeve (PBHZ) was a building complex for fairs and events in Zuidlaren, Netherlands. Opened in 1956, the complex consisted of three halls which were all named after members of the Dutch royal family. The largest hall was the Prince Constantijn hall, situated next to main entrance of the building. The building complex was demolished in 2016.

Fairs and events

In 1999 and 2000 the Domino Day took place in the Prins Bernhardhoeve complex. Jumping Indoor Zuidlaren was an annual horse riding competition in the PBH complex until 2010.

Surface
The surface of the PBHZ building complex where fairs and events were held was 16.000 m2. The surface of the Prince Constantijn hall was 5544 m2.  The smallest hall was the Prins Johan Friso hall with a surface of 2820 m2.

External links
Prins Bernhardhoeve

Convention centres in the Netherlands
Buildings and structures in Drenthe
Tynaarlo
Demolished buildings and structures in the Netherlands
Buildings and structures demolished in 2016